J.A. Deane was a musician, performing sometimes on trombone, but more often on synthesizers and live, real-time sampler.

Deane appeared on the pioneering 1985 live recording of Cobra by John Zorn. He has recorded with Jon Hassell, and has performed extensively with Butch Morris. From 1997 to 2013 he led the Out of Context ensemble, which further explored the language of conduction developed by Butch Morris. Out of Context has released CDs on the Zerx and High Mayhem record labels based out of Albuquerque and Santa Fe, New Mexico, respectively. 

The following list highlights some of his many music-related activities, is taken predominantly from his Web site, and is neither complete nor detailed:

 Played trombone, alto-flute, clavinet and string synthesizer for Ike and Tina Turner on and around Nutbush City Limits, and for Tina Turner after she and Ike split up.
 Rigged up his trombone with electronics to control analog synths - pre-MIDI – and used tape echo to create a live-looping system.
 Played in the art-punk band Indoor Life, which took him from San Fran to NYC, which led to him playing samplers and electronics for Jon Hassell.
 With Hassell, started doing something he called “live sampling,” possibly coining the term. Appeared on Hassell’s landmark album Power Spot.
 Back in San Francisco, played trombone and electronics on three John Zorn albums, with COBRA gaining the most attention.
 Started playing with Butch Morris in the 80s – trombone, electronics and sampler – including Morris’ touring trio with Wayne Horvitz in ’86 and throughout the European festival circuit 88-90.
 Moved to Ribera, NM in ’95 and engaged in a new musical community. Releases include NOMAD (Victo), works for dance for his partner, Colleen Mulvihill (Olympic gymnast, choreographer, dancer). Their partnership lasted 38 years, ending with her death in 2019.
 Coproduced a 10-CD boxed set for Morris called Testament (New World). Performed with Morris and Le Quan Ninh (percussionist) at Berlin’s ’93 FMP festival, released as Burning Cloud.
 Played lap steel, piano and bass flute in The Bubbadinos, “the world’s worst country band.”
 Recorded the definitive version of Steve Peters’ Webster Cycles
 Developed sound designs for Sam Shepard (Fool for Love), Theatre Grottesco and many more
 Expanding on a vocabulary of hand signals originated by Butch Morris, led the Out of Context ensemble for 15 years, with members spanning Santa Fe and Albuquerque, NM.
 Worked tirelessly to preserve Morris’ legacy and contributions.

Deane died Friday, July 23, 2021 (Mountain time).

Discography

With Jon Hassell
Power Spot (ECM, 1986)
With Wayne Horvitz
Miracle Mile (Elektra/Musician, 1992)
With John Zorn
Cobra (Hathut, 1987)
performs music of Steve Peters
The Webster Cycles (album) (Cold Blue Music, 2008)

References

External links
 Official J.A. Deane site

American electronic musicians
Living people
Year of birth missing (living people)
American trombonists